The Essence of the Thing (1997) is a novel by Australian author Madeleine St John. It was shortlisted for the Man Booker Prize in 1997.

Plot summary

The novel begins with the end of a relationship as the novel's protagonist Nicola Gatling, returning from a trip to the shops to get some cigarettes, is told by her lover Jonathan that he wants her to move out of their shared flat. The story follows Nicola's attempts to remake her life over the ensuing several weeks in 1990s London.

Awards
 1997 shortlisted for the Man Booker Prize

Notes
The novel carried the following dedication:

"For Judith McCue"

Reviews

Gardner McFall in The New York Times in 1999 opined "In this novel, which was a finalist for the 1997 Booker Prize, Madeleine St. John shapes what might have been a bathetic story into a brisk, sophisticated and artful narrative buoyed by an ironic use of the religious imagery of hell, salvation and resurrection."

The book was re-issued in 2013 as part of the Text Publishing Text Classics series. At the time of the publication of that edition Gay Lynch wrote in Transnational Literature: "The prose is spare, supple and elegant, and constructed for the most part in dialogue that, occasionally, falls into a mechanical 'jolly hockey-sticks' register, with frequent play on the words 'whizzy' and the suffix 'ish'...Nevertheless, St John is a fine writer and this book is no grungy Australian bildungsroman; it is more a comedy of manners, perhaps or a Roman à clef."

References

1997 Australian novels
Novels set in London
Fourth Estate books